Kalpana may refer to:

Film and television
 Kalpana (1948 film), an Indian Hindi-language dance film 
 Kalpana (1960 film), a romantic Bollywood film
 Kalpana (1970 film), an Indian Malayalam film
 Kalpana (2012 film), an Indian Kannada-language comedy horror film
 Kalpana (TV series), an Indian TV series

People

Mononym
 Kalpana (Kannada actress) (1943–1979), Indian Kannada film actress
 Kalpana (Malayalam actress) (1965–2016), Indian Malayalam film actress

Surname
 Venkatacher Kalpana (born 1961), Indian cricketer

Given name
 Kalpana Chakma, Bangladeshi indigenous women's rights activist
 Kalpana Chawla (1961–2003), Indian American astronaut lost in the Space Shuttle Columbia disaster
 Kalpana Dash (born 1966), Indian lawyer and mountaineer
 Kalpana Datta (1913–1995), Indian independence movement activist and fighter
 Kalpana Iyer (born c. 1950), Indian beauty pageant contestant and Hindi film actress
 Kalpana Kartik (born 1931), Indian Hindi film actress
 Kalpana Lajmi (1954–2018), Indian film director, producer and screenwriter
 Kalpana Mohan (1946–2012), Indian Hindi film actress
 Kalpana Ramesh Narhire (born 1969), Indian politician from Osmanabad, Maharashtra
 Kalpana Pandit, Indian Hindi actress, model and physician
 Kalpana Raghavendar, Indian playback singer
 Kalpana Saxena, Indian police officer
 Kalpana Swaminathan (born 1956), Indian writer and doctor

Other uses
 Kalpana (imagination), a Vedantic view
 Kalpana (supercomputer), at NASA's Ames Research Center
 Kalpana (company), inventor of the first Ethernet network switch
 Kalpana-1, an Indian meteorological satellite

See also